Tarja Laitiainen is a Finnish diplomat. She started working for the Ministry for Foreign Affairs in 1980. Laitianien was appointed as the Finnish Ambassador to Portugal in Lisbon on October 1, 2016.

Laitiainen worked in Portugal at the Ministry of Foreign Affairs as Head of National Security Authority (NSA). She has worked at the Finnish Embassies in Lima and Tokyo and in the Finnish UN and UNESCO delegations. She was a national expert at the EU Commission in 1996-1998. In the Foreign Ministry, she has worked in various positions at the Political and Development Policy Department and as Head of Asia and Oceania. Laitiainen has served as a rotating ambassador to Afghanistan and Pakistan from 2002 to 2005 and as ambassador to Finland in Luxembourg since 2005 and thereafter in Bulgaria as of 13 March 2009 and at the same time in Kosovo.

References 

Ambassadors of Finland to Portugal
Ambassadors of Finland to Pakistan
Ambassadors of Finland to Afghanistan
Ambassadors of Finland to Luxembourg
Ambassadors of Finland to Kosovo
Finnish women diplomats
Finnish women ambassadors